was a Japanese rock band founded by former Lazy members Hiroyuki Tanaka and Shunji Inoe after the dissolution of Lazy. The band was active in the 1980s.

Members
Vocal: Tomoaki Taka
Guitar: Takumi Abe
Bass: Hiroyuki Tanaka
Keyboard: Shunji Inoe
Drums: Masato Wada (withdrew from the band in 1985), Shigeji Tamura (joined the band after Wada's departure)

Anime theme songs
 - Opening theme of Psycho Armor Govarian.
 - Ending theme of Psycho Armor Govarian.
 - Insert song of Psycho Armor Govarian.
 - Insert song of Psycho Armor Govarian.
 -  Opening theme of Uchu Densetsu Ulysses 31.
  - Ending theme of Uchu Densetsu Ulysses 31.

Discography

Singles

* These singles were promoted as Tomoaki Taka singles.

Albums

Other

References

External links
Neverland  on Anison Generation database

Japanese musical groups
Japanese rock music groups
Musical groups established in 1981
Musical groups disestablished in 1990